Mount Davidson is a mountain,  high, standing at the head of Albrecht Penck Glacier in Victoria Land. It was discovered by the British National Antarctic Expedition (1901–04) which named it for a member of the ship's company of the Morning, relief ship to the expedition.

References
 

Mountains of Victoria Land
Scott Coast